Jacob Ray Rogers (born April 18, 1995) is an American professional baseball catcher for the Detroit Tigers of Major League Baseball (MLB). He made his MLB debut in 2019.

Amateur career
Rogers attended Canyon High School in Canyon, Texas, and played for the school's baseball team. In 2013, as a senior, he batted .492 with six home runs and 48 runs batted in (RBIs). Undrafted out of high school in the 2013 MLB draft, he enrolled at Tulane University where he played college baseball for the Tulane Green Wave. In 2015, he played collegiate summer baseball with the Hyannis Harbor Hawks of the Cape Cod Baseball League, and was named a league all-star. In 2016, as a junior at Tulane, he hit .261 with seven home runs and 28 RBIs in 61 games. After the season, the Houston Astros selected Rogers in the third round of the 2016 Major League Baseball draft.

Professional career

Houston Astros
Rogers signed and made his professional debut with the Tri-City ValleyCats and after batting .253 with two home runs and 12 RBIs in 25 games was later promoted to the Quad Cities River Bandits where he finished the season, batting .208 in 21 games. He started the 2017 season with Quad Cities where he posted a .255 batting average with six home runs and 15 RBIs and was promoted to the Buies Creek Astros where he greatly improved, posting a .265 average with a career high 12 home runs and 55 RBIs in 83 games.

Detroit Tigers
On August 31, 2017, the Astros traded Rogers to the Detroit Tigers, along with Franklin Pérez and Daz Cameron, for Justin Verlander. Detroit then assigned him to the Lakeland Flying Tigers where he played in two games. Rogers spent 2018 with the Erie SeaWolves, hitting .219 with 17 home runs and 56 RBIs in 99 games. He returned to Erie to begin 2019 before being promoted to the Toledo Mud Hens. Rogers was named to the 2019 All-Star Futures Game.

On July 30, 2019, the Tigers selected Rogers' contract and promoted him to the major leagues. He had been hitting .250 between AA and AAA with 14 home runs and 52 RBI, while throwing out 25 of 48 base stealers (52.1%). Rogers played that night and got his first major league hit in the 7th inning, an RBI single off Taylor Cole of the Los Angeles Angels. In the next game on July 31, Rogers hit his first major league home run off the Angels' José Suárez. In 35 games for Detroit, Rogers hit .125 with 4 home runs. Rogers did not make an appearance for the Tigers in 2020.

Rogers was optioned to the Tigers' alternate training site in Toledo to start the 2021 season. He was recalled to the major league club on May 7. On July 19, Rogers was placed on the 10-day injured list with a forearm strain. On August 18, the Tigers transferred Rogers to the 60-day injured list after the strain did not respond to treatment. On September 8, the Tigers announced that Rogers had undergone Tommy John surgery and would miss at least a year. On April 6, 2022, Rogers was placed on the Tigers' 60-day Injured List.

References

External links

Tulane Green Wave bio

1995 births
Living people
People from Canyon, Texas
Baseball players from Texas
Major League Baseball catchers
Detroit Tigers players
Tulane Green Wave baseball players
Hyannis Harbor Hawks players
Tri-City ValleyCats players
Quad Cities River Bandits players
Buies Creek Astros players
Lakeland Flying Tigers players
Erie SeaWolves players
Toledo Mud Hens players
Mesa Solar Sox players